A pimp is someone who finds and manages clients for prostitutes and engages them in prostitution in order to profit from their earnings.

Pimp or pimping may also refer to:

Films
 Pimp (2010 film), a British film
 Pimp (2018 film), an American film
 Iceberg Slim: Portrait of a Pimp (2012), a biographical documentary film produced by Ice-T

Music
 Pimp C, a rapper
"Pimp", a song by hHead from Jerk (1994)
 "P.I.M.P." (2003), a hip hop single by 50 Cent
 "Pimpin'", a song by Hollywood Undead from Swan Songs (2008)
 "The Pimp" (2002), an EP by Fatboy Slim 
 "The Pimp" (2006), a song by The Fratellis

Other uses
 Pimp: The Backhanding, a card game
 Pimp: The Story of My Life (1967), autobiography by Iceberg Slim
 Pimping (in baseball), showboating for fans
Solanum pimpinellifolium, a wild species of tomato

See also
 PMIP (disambiguation)